Kumaragoppa is a village in Dharwad district of Karnataka, India.

Demographics 
As of the 2011 Census of India there were 145 households in Kumaragoppa and a total population of 810 consisting of 421 males and 389 females. There were 112 children ages 0-6.

References

Villages in Dharwad district